"To Me, To You (Bruv)" is a 2014 charity single by Tinchy Stryder and the Chuckle Brothers. It was released on 23 October 2014 on Cloud 9 and was produced by longtime Tinchy Stryder affiliate Dirty Danger. The song was released in aid of the African-Caribbean Leukaemia Trust.

The song entered and peaked at number 92 on the UK Singles Chart.

Background
Tinchy Stryder watched the Chuckle Brothers on television as a child and, after meeting the pair when recording an episode of Celebrity Juice, they struck up a rapport. Shortly after a video emerged online of the group in the studio together.

Music video
A music video for the song was recorded by SB.TV and was set on a suburban British street reminiscent of a typical setting for the Chuckle Brother's popular ChuckleVision TV program. It featured Jamal Edwards, Dirty Danger, Tinchy Stryder and the Chuckle Brothers arguing over a ladder, playing ping pong and skanking in a comedic fashion.

Chart performance
On 31 October 2014 the single entered and peaked at number 92 in the UK Singles Chart

Charts

References

2014 singles
Charity singles
All-star recordings
Tinchy Stryder
2014 songs
Songs with music by Tinchy Stryder